Serampore Municipality is the civic body that governs Serampore and its surrounding areas (Mahesh, Tin Bazar, Battala and partly Chatra) in Srirampore subdivision of Hooghly district, West Bengal, India.

History
Serampore is the first town in Bengal to voluntarily adopt the Municipal Act of 1850 Sec XX16. It is not clear when Serampore Municipality was established.

Serampore is a pre-colonial town on the west bank of the Hooghly. It was part of Danish India, under the name of Fredericksnagore, from 1755 to 1845.

Geography

Serampore Municipality covers an area of 17.60 km2 and has a total population of 183,339 (2011).

In 1981, 29.44% of the total population formed main workers and 70.56% were non-workers in Serampore Municipality and 54.25% of the total main workers were industrial workers. This may be interpreted as follows: although industrial activities are prominent in the municipal areas of the region, the major portion of the population is commuters and migrants find employment in the area.

Healthcare
Serampore Walsh Super Speciaity (Subdivisional) Hospital, with 266 beds, Serampore TB Hospital, with 55 beds, Serampore ESI Hospital, with 216 beds, are located in the Serampore Municipality area.

Elections
In the 2015 municipal elections for Serampore Municipality Trinamool Congress won 22 seats, CPI(M) 4 seats,  Congress 1 seat and Independents 2 seats.

In the 2010 municipal elections for Serampore Municipality Trinamool Congress won 13 seats, Congress 5 seats, CPI (M) 6 seats and Independents 5 seats.

About the 2010 municipal elections, The Guardian wrote, "Today's municipal elections are unlike any for decades: the Communists, who have held West Bengal's main towns almost without a break since the 1970s, are facing disaster… This time defeat is likely to be definitive and could signal the beginning of the end for the Communist Party of India-Marxist (CPIM)."

In the 2005 municipal elections for Serampore Municipality, Congress won 14 seats, CPI (M) 4 seats, CPI 2 seats,  Trinamool Congress 4 seats and others 1 seat.

References

 

Municipalities of West Bengal